Three Sons is a 1939 American drama film directed by Jack Hively using a screenplay by John Twist, based on the novel, Sweepings by Lester Cohen. Produced and distributed by RKO Radio Pictures, and released on October 13, 1939, it is a remake of an earlier RKO film, Sweepings (1933). The film stars Edward Ellis, William Gargan, J. Edward Bromberg and Robert Stanton (whose real name was Kirby Grant, which he would use for most of his career). Gargan, who plays the uncle in this film, had played one of the sons in the earlier film.

Plot

Daniel Pardway (Edward Ellis) a  department store owner is deeply saddened to learn that none of his grown sons are interested in taking over the business he has worked so hard to build. To coerce them, he even tries giving them shares of company stock. In the end, only the youngest son shows any interest at all.

Cast
 Edward Ellis as Daniel Pardway
 William Gargan as Thane Pardway
 Kent Taylor as Gene Pardway
 J. Edward Bromberg as Abe Ullman
 Katharine Alexander as Abigail Pardway
 Virginia Vale as Phoebe Pardway
 Robert Stanton as Bert Pardway (as Robert Stanton)
 Dick Hogan as Freddie Pardway
 Grady Sutton as Grimson
 Pamela Blake as Mamie Donaldson (as Adele Pearce)
 Alexander D'Arcy as Prince Nicky - Phoebe's Husband
 Barbara Pepper as Viola

References

External links 
 
 
 
 

1939 films
American drama films
American black-and-white films
Films scored by Roy Webb
Films based on American novels
1939 drama films
RKO Pictures films
Remakes of American films
Films directed by Jack Hively
1930s English-language films
1930s American films